Alexei Georgiyevich Vasilevsky (born March 5, 1980, in Moscow) is a Russian former competitive figure skater. He won two silver medals on the ISU Junior Grand Prix (JGP) series and bronze at the 1998–99 JGP Final in Detroit. He also won six senior international medals, including gold at the 2003 Winter Universiade in Tarvisio, Italy. His highest placement at an ISU Championship was 9th at the 1997 World Junior Championships in Seoul and his highest placement at the Russian Championships was 4th, which he achieved in 1999. He was coached by Elena Tchaikovskaia in Moscow.

Programs

Competitive highlights
JGP: ISU Junior Series/Junior Grand Prix

References

External links
 
 Tracings.net profile

Russian male single skaters
Universiade medalists in figure skating
1980 births
Living people
Figure skaters from Moscow
Universiade gold medalists for Russia
Universiade silver medalists for Russia
Medalists at the 1999 Winter Universiade
Medalists at the 2003 Winter Universiade
Competitors at the 2001 Winter Universiade